Peter Schmid (born 1898) was a Swiss skier. He competed at the 1924 Winter Olympics in Chamonix, where he placed 11th in Nordic combined, 14th in 18 km cross-country, and 18th in ski jumping.

References

1898 births
Date of death unknown
Swiss male Nordic combined skiers
Swiss male ski jumpers
Swiss male cross-country skiers
Olympic Nordic combined skiers of Switzerland
Olympic cross-country skiers of Switzerland
Olympic ski jumpers of Switzerland
Nordic combined skiers at the 1924 Winter Olympics
Ski jumpers at the 1924 Winter Olympics
Cross-country skiers at the 1924 Winter Olympics